Temnothorax tarbinskii is a species of ant in the genus Temnothorax, that is native to Kyrgyzstan.

References

External links

Myrmicinae
Hymenoptera of Asia
Insects of Central Asia
Endemic fauna of Kyrgyzstan
Insects described in 1976
Taxonomy articles created by Polbot
Taxobox binomials not recognized by IUCN